The Three Garridebs is a 1937 television presentation that aired on NBC,  based on Sir Arthur Conan Doyle's 1924 story "The Adventure of the Three Garridebs". Louis Hector played Sherlock Holmes, the first actor to do so on television.

Production
In 1937, NBC received permission from Conan Doyle's widow, Lady Jean Conan Doyle, to produce a live adaptation of Conan Doyle's "The Adventure of the Three Garridebs". NBC television director Thomas H. Hutchinson began scripting the teleplay, which was so faithful, with much dialogue nearly verbatim, that it was published three years later in a textbook on broadcast production.  It is considered the first known television pilot.

Hector, cast as Sherlock Holmes, had previously portrayed Holmes in an American radio series from 1934 to 1935.  He had also played Holmes' arch-nemesis Professor Moriarty on the series.

Outside of an opening scene using previously filmed footage of the London skyline, the bulk of the action took place on studio sets of 221B Baker Street and the home of Holmes' client Nathan Garrideb. Only three sets were built: 221B Baker Street, Nathan Garrideb's home and Inspector Lestrade's office. Previously filmed footage of Hector and Podmore riding in a hansom cab was used to link the action on the sets.

Reception
The teleplay was performed live six times during the final week of November 1937.  The New York Times called it "...the most ambitious experiment in teleshowmanship so far attempted in the air above New York" and said "in six performances for members of The American Radio Relay League, the ingenious welding of film and television production offered an interesting glimpse into the future of a new form of dramatic art..."  The cast was praised as well: "Louis Hector, in traditional cape, peaked cap, and double-breasted suit, played Holmes in the approved manner and at all times gave the impression that a manhunt was in progress ... His determined manner throughout gave convincing evidence of the ultimate outcome—that the detective would surely 'get his man'."

Cast
Louis Hector as Sherlock Holmes
William Podmore as Doctor Watson
Violet Besson as Mrs. Hudson
Arthur Maitland as John Garrideb
James Spottswood as Nathan Garrideb
Eustace Wyatt as Inspector Lestrade
Selma Hall as Mrs. Saunders

References

External links

1937 television films
1937 films
Sherlock Holmes films based on works by Arthur Conan Doyle
Films set in London
American television series premieres
NBC network original films
Television films as pilots
Crime television films
1937 in American television